Gmina Kamień may refer to either of the following rural administrative districts in Poland:
Gmina Kamień, Lublin Voivodeship
Gmina Kamień, Subcarpathian Voivodeship